Low is a township municipality in the La Vallée-de-la-Gatineau Regional County Municipality of western Quebec, Canada. It is situated along the Gatineau River north of Wakefield, and it is located within Canada's National Capital Region. Its 2021 population was 1,020.

Low received its name from Charles Adamson Low, a lumber merchant who held timber rights in the Gatineau Valley.

A section of Low called Tucker Lake was home of the Gatineau Clog, a country music festival founded by Wayne Rostad in 1980 until 1995.

The mayor of Low is Carole Robert, who was elected in November 2017. The two most recent former mayors were Morris O'Connor and Michael Francis, who was mayor back in the mid-eighties, and was re-elected in 1997. Francis announced his retirement in the summer of 2009, and finished his term in November 2009.

Geography

Low is situated in a corner of mountainous terrain on the edge of the Gatineau Hills, but conducive to agriculture. It is dotted with an abundance of lakes, most notably Sainte-Marie, Island, Doyle, Cameron, and Venosta Lakes.

History
Low represents a rare case where the township was formed after the municipality; the township dates back to 1859 whereas the municipality was founded in 1848 and the municipality township was officially established on 1 January 1857, and came into force on 1 January 1858. It was named after Charles Adamson Low, an important timber merchant of the region in the mid-19th century, a time when many Irish immigrants settled here. Its post office was established in 1854.

In 1928 the village of Low built the Paugan hydroelectric dam. This caused the voluntary flooding of the village to the north, Lac Saint Marie, Quebec. Because of the dam, 90% of the village of Lac Saint Marie had to be relocated to higher ground.

Demographics 

Population trend:
 Population in 2021: 1,020 (2016 to 2021 population change: 3.9%)
 Population in 2016: 982 (2011 to 2016 population change: 6.7%)
 Population in 2011: 920 (2006 to 2011 population change: -3.8%)
 Population in 2006: 956 (2001 to 2006 population change: 12.2%)
 Population in 2001: 852
 Population in 1996: 807
 Population in 1991: 892

Languages:
 English as first language: 52.3%
 French as first language: 46.7%
 Other as first language: 1.0%

Paugan Hydroelectric Station
The Paugan Station (Centrale de Paugan), built in 1928, is a run-of-river hydroelectric power station and dam on the Gatineau river, operated by Hydro-Québec.

References

Township municipalities in Quebec
Incorporated places in Outaouais